John Musgrave (born 1948) is an American Vietnam veteran, poet, counselor, and veterans' affairs advocate.

John Musgrave may also refer to:

 John Musgrave (cricketer), English cricketer
 John Oliver Musgrave, New Zealand motor transport operator
 John Musgrave & Sons, a company that manufactured stationary steam engines

See also
 Jonathan Musgrave, British orienteering competitor